My Secret Terrius is a 2018 South Korean television series starring So Ji-sub, Jung In-sun, Son Ho-jun and Im Se-mi. It was aired on MBC from September 27 to November 15, 2018 on Wednesdays and Thursdays at 21:55 (KST) time slot.

Synopsis
A woman named Go Ae-rin (Jung In-sun) loses her husband. Along with her neighbour Kim Bon (So Ji-sub), who was an NIS agent, they discover the truth behind her husband's involvement in a huge conspiracy.

Cast

Main
 So Ji-sub as Kim Bon(Terrius)
A legendary black ops agent at the National Intelligence Service (NIS). 
 Jung In-sun as Go Ae-rin(Alice) 
A single mother who finds herself getting caught up in solving a conspiracy with Kim Bon.
 Son Ho-jun as Jin Young-tae 
A former con man who holds the key to a mysterious incident that Go Ae-rin and Kim Bon are involved in. 
 Im Se-mi as Yoo Ji-yeon
A NIS agent who is cold on the outside, but warm to Kim Bon, whom she has feelings for.

Supporting

NIS agent
Um Hyo-sup as Shim Woo-cheol
Head of the NIS who values patriotism, loyalty and camaraderie. 
Seo Yi-sook as Kwon Yeong-sil
Second-in-command and deputy director of the NIS. She is an ambitious, cold and calculating woman who hopes to take control of the agency, and who holds a secret about the conspiracy.
Kim Sung-joo as Ra Do-woo/
A genius hacker who is rebellious. He likes Yoo Ji-yeon.

KIS agent
Kim Yeo-jin as Shim Eun-ha
Chief of Kingcastle Information System (KIS). A woman with superb investigative skills. 
Jung Si-ah as Bong Sun-mi
A KIS agent who has a crush on Kim Bon. 
Kang Ki-young as Kim Sang-ryeol 
The only male KIS agent in the team.

Others
Yang Dong-geun as Cha Jung-il
Park Ji-hyun as Clara Choi
Kim Gun-woo as Cha Jun-soo
Ok Ye-rin as Cha Joon-hee
Hwang Ji-ah as Jo Seo-hyun
Lee Joo-won as Jo Seung-hyun
Kim Dan-woo as Han Yoo-ra
Oh Han-kyul as Kim Seung-gi
Jasper Cho as K
Lee Hyun-geol as Park Soo-il
Kim Byeong-ok as Yoon Choon-sang
Kim Ji-eun as Yong-tae's secretary
Park Soon-cheon as Lee Ji-sook
Mirosław Zbrojewicz as a following spy
 Mateusz Bąkowski (polish pianist, teacher music)

Special appearance
Kim Myung-soo as Moon Sung-soo
Head of the national security at the Blue House. 
Nam Gyu-ri as Choi Eun-kyung
A nuclear physicist from North Korea, and Kim Bon's ex-girlfriend.
Yoon Sang-hyun as Yoo Ji-sub (ep 17, 19 & 20)
Obgyn surgeon, brother of Yoo Ji-yeon
 Lee Jun-hyeok
 a shaman (ep. 11)

Production
Lee Yoo-young and Yoo In-na were offered the female lead role but declined.
First script reading took place late June, 2018 at MBC Broadcasting Station in Sangam, South Korea.

Original soundtrack

Part 1

Part 2

Part 3

Part 4

Part 5

Part 6

Ratings

Awards and nominations

Notes

References

External links

 

MBC TV television dramas
2018 South Korean television series debuts
2018 South Korean television series endings
Korean-language television shows
South Korean romantic comedy television series
South Korean mystery television series
Television shows set in Warsaw
National Intelligence Service (South Korea) in fiction